The Sulawesi Canal, also known as Equatorial Canal, refers to proposals for a canal on the island of Sulawesi with the aim of becoming a busy international sea route that will shorten the sea transport distance from the eastern part of Sulawesi Island to the western part of Indonesia, as well as to the Philippines and Malaysia.

History 
The idea of making a canal though Sulawesi was first suggested by the Governor of Gorontalo, Rusli Habibie, back on 30 January 2015. The proposal was made when he was given the opportunity to present a regional programme related to the potential development of the Indonesian Sea Route Region II (ALKI II) at the Ministry of Maritime Affairs and Fisheries (KKP) Office. According to the Governor, the Sulawesi Canal, which is located in the "neck" of Sulawesi Island, was seen as very strategic to encourage the development of ALKI, especially for the central part of Indonesia. The canal is to facilitate access to sea transport connecting Western and Eastern Indonesia. In addition to proposing the Sulawesi Canal, Rusli also proposed that in the implementation of APBN project work in the regions to consider local entrepreneurs and human resources. This is intended so that the regional economy can grow better.

Six local governments in Sulawesi are planning to build an equatorial canal that will cut across the island of Sulawesi. This canal will connect the Gulf of Tomini with the Makassar Strait. The six provinces are Gorontalo, South Sulawesi, Central Sulawesi, West Sulawesi, Southeast Sulawesi, and North Sulawesi. The canal, which will later be named the Equatorial Canal, will cut the neck of Sulawesi Island so that it looks as if it is divided into two because it is separated by the sea in the canal.

The Equatorial Canal could become a busy international sea route and would shorten sea transport distances from the eastern part of Sulawesi Island to western Indonesia, as well as to the Philippines and Malaysia.

However, the project is not without its controversies. There were many protests when six governors planned to build the canal. At first glance, the canal would bring economic progress, although there was a price to pay. What is certain is the destruction of the Sulawesi ecosystem, which is known to be rich in unique biodiversity and is included in Wallacea. The canal will potentially damage the world's ocean current system and the ecology of the Gulf of Tomini and the Sulawesi Sea.

The canal would also benefit the sustainability of the gas industry in Sulawesi, especially the shipping of LNG products from PT Donggi Senoro LNG in Luwuk, Banggai, Central Sulawesi.

The canal would be considered as a gateway to Eastern Indonesia, according to Member of the House of Representatives Commission VII for the 2014–2019 period Ahmad Ali. And with the prospects of Indonesia's new capital, Nusantara, the effect of moving the national capital from Jakarta to Kalimantan would be seen as a way to accelerate business and economy of Sulawesi and eastern provinces.

See also 

 Thai Canal
 Nicaragua Canal
 Suez Canal

References 

Central Sulawesi
Sulawesi
Proposed canals